Palace Station is a hotel and casino located in Las Vegas, Nevada. It is owned and operated by Station Casinos and has 576 rooms. Palace Station has a large Asian customer base mainly because of its location near Chinatown.

History
In 1976, Frank Fertitta Jr., a former general manager at the Fremont, and his two partners,  opened The Casino, a  gambling hall attached to a Mini Price Motor Inn, in an off-Strip location where few observers expected it to succeed. In 1977, he added bingo and renamed the property as the Bingo Palace. The casino was the first to target a clientele of local residents with offerings like giveaways, cheap buffets and bingo. It thrived, and Fertitta soon bought out his partners' shares. Other locals casinos like Sam's Town and the Gold Coast followed in later years.

In 1984, the Bingo Palace was expanded and remodeled with a railroad theme, and renamed to the Palace Station Hotel & Casino. The grand opening ceremony was held on April 6, featuring Governor Richard Bryan and the historic locomotive Inyo. In 1985, Fertitta purchased the adjoining 465-room motel. A 21-story hotel tower and high-rise parking garage were added in 1990, bringing the room count to 1,041.

In 1993, Fertitta bought the land for what would become Boulder Station, the beginning of an expansion that would grow Station Casinos into a billion dollar company. But Fertitta left the firm that same year, turning management over to his sons when it went public.

Early in 2009, Improv Vegas opened at the Bonkerz Comedy Club which was renamed from the Sound Trax lounge. The tower rooms have recently been remodeled.

On October 17, 2016, employees voted to narrowly reject the unionization of a hotel and casino property by 266 to 262. It was organized by the Bartenders Union and the Culinary Workers Union and supervised by the National Labor Relations Board (NLRB) under the Obama administration. It was the first and only Station Casinos property to not be unionized by a vote margin.

On March 13, 2017, Station Casinos agreed to settle disputes with the National Labor Relations Board (NLRB) under the Trump administration by letting these employees, the Bartenders Union and the Culinary Workers Union to unionize the property. It is the third Station Casinos property to be unionized.

A $192 million renovation began in fall 2016, and was completed two years later. Palace Station remained open during renovations. As part of the renovation, the Palace Station's train theme was removed in favor of a modern design. The 126-foot Palace Station sign was removed during 2018, marking the end of the train theme. Palace Station's motel portion, with approximately 447 rooms, was demolished as part of the renovation project. A new bingo room opened during 2017.

A grand re-opening celebration, including a fireworks show, was held on September 1, 2018. The  addition included 500 additional slot machines and a 300-space parking lot on the property's east side. The renovation also featured four new restaurants, including a revamped buffet. A Regal Cinemas movie theater called Regal's Cinnebare, part of the renovation project, opened on December 18, 2018.

Incidents
The hotel has seen its share of accidents and misadventures, including a cashier's cage robbery in 1992, a 21st-floor fire caused by lightning in 1998, an armored car robbery in the parking lot in 2009 and most notoriously, the 2007 robbery of sports memorabilia by O. J. Simpson and his associates.

Gallery

References

External links

 

1976 establishments in Nevada
Casino hotels
Casinos completed in 1976
Casinos in the Las Vegas Valley
Hotel buildings completed in 1976
Hotels established in 1976
Companies that filed for Chapter 11 bankruptcy in 2009
O. J. Simpson
Skyscraper hotels in Las Vegas
Station Casinos